is a Japanese education policy which reduces the hours and the content of the curriculum in primary education. In recent years, the mass media in Japan have used this phrase to criticize drops in scholastic ability.

About 
In Japan, primary education is prescribed by a teaching guideline called . Since the 1970s, the Japanese government gradually reduced the amount of class time and the contents given in the guideline, and this tendency is called yutori education. However, in recent years, notably after the 2011 earthquake, this has been a controversial issue.

Yutori education may be translated as "relaxed education" or "education free from pressure", stemming from the word .

History 
In the 1970s, school violence and the collapse of classroom discipline became a big problem in junior high schools. So, the government revised the teaching guideline in 1977. The main purpose was to reduce education stress and to introduce relaxed classes called .

The council recommended that education regard the individual personalities of each student as paramount. Two major revisions of the teaching guidelines in 1989 and 1998 were implemented following this announcement.

In 1987,  declared four basic core principles to improve education in kindergartens, elementary schools, and junior and senior high schools.
 To form people with strength, confidence, and open minds.
 To create self-motivated students able to deal with changes in society.
 To teach the fundamental knowledge needed by Japanese people and to enrich education to ensure it considers individuality as very important.
 To form people who fully understand international society while still respecting Japanese culture and traditions.

Under these principles, the teaching guideline were revised in 1989. In the lower grades of elementary schools, science and social studies classes were abolished and "environmental studies" was introduced. In junior high school, the number of elective classes was increased to further motivate students.

From 1992, schools closed on the second Saturday of every month to increase student spare time in accordance with the teaching guidelines. From 1995, schools closed on the fourth Saturday also.

In 1996, when the 15th  was asked about what the Japanese education of the 21st century should be like, it submitted a report suggesting "the ability to survive" should be the basic principle of education. "The ability to survive" is defined as a principle that tries to keep the balance of intellectual, moral, and physical education.

In 1998, the teaching guidelines were revised to reflect the council's report. 30% of the curriculum was cut and "time for integrated study" in elementary and junior high school was established. It was a drastic change.

The School Curriculum Council stated its goals in a report.
 To enrich humanity, sociability, and the awareness of living as a Japanese within international society.
 To develop the ability to think and learn independently.
 To inculcate fundamental concepts in children at an appropriate pace while developing their individuality.
 To let every school form its own ethos.

Around 1999, a decline in the academic abilities of university students became a serious concern. Elementary and secondary education started to be reconsidered. This trend focused criticism on the new teaching guidelines and aroused controversy.

In 2002, schools were no longer compulsory on Saturdays.

Criticism 
Many people who oppose pressure-free education worry that it may lower children's scholastic ability, and also create a widening gap in scholastic ability. Some criticism is based on a misunderstanding of Yutori education.
 Japanese education performance test (PISA) results are not keeping pace internationally. 
 Surveys of university students' math ability show very poor attainment. 
 Yutori education may be good in principle but has not been implemented successfully. 
 The workload of teachers has increased. 
 Insufficient attention to educational fundamentals. 
 If state schools are insufficient, children will need to go to a Juku, which costs a great deal. 
 Working class children will find it more difficult to progress to higher education and find good jobs.

Responses 

 The drop in scholastic ability is natural because the society is more affluent. Students in OECD nations are comfortable and less motivated. 
 How should we define "scholastic ability?" 
 Has scholastic ability really dropped? 
 It is very difficult to judge scholastic ability objectively, so the results of tests don't necessarily indicate an overall drop in scholastic ability. 
 Yutori education may reduce average scholastic ability, but it can develop the talents of a small number of gifted children. 
 The criticisms lack adequate evidence. 
 It is reported that achievement tests by the IEA and PISA both indicate Japanese students ability has continued to fall, but these two tests are different in what they intend to measure. 
 The IEA mainly checks students' ability to recall facts while PISA checks their "ability to survive" and "ability to think". PISA's tests have been done only twice, and in the second test, countries participating increased. Moreover, in Japan, integrated studies were introduced in 2002, and PISA's test was done in 2003, so Japanese examinees had been under the new curriculum for only one year in junior high school. It is too early to determine whether integrated studies are successful.

See also 
 Education in Japan
 History of education in Japan
 Juku
 Ministry of Education, Culture, Sports, Science and Technology (Japan)

References 

Yamanouchi, Kenshi (山内乾史) Hara, Kiyoharu (原清治). 2006. Gakuryoku mondai・Yutori kyouiku (学力問題・ゆとり教育). Nihontoshosentā. 
Terawaki, Ken (寺脇研). 2007. Soredemo, Yutori kyouiku wa machigatteinai(それでも、ゆとり教育は間違っていない) Fusousha. 
Iwaki, Hideo (岩木秀夫). 2004. Yutori kyouiku kara Kosei rouhi shakai e (ゆとり教育から個性浪費社会へ), Chikumashinsho. 
Asahi Shimbun kyouiku shuzaihan(朝日新聞教育取材班). 2003. Tenki no Kyouiku (転機の教育, Education at a turning point) Asahibunko.

External links 
 Gakushu shidou youryou(in Japanese)

Academic pressure in East Asian culture
Education laws and guidelines in Japan